Gowdru Hotel is a 2017 Indian Kannada-language drama directed by Pon Kumaran and starring Rachan Chandra, Vedhika and Prakash Raj. The film is a Remake of  the Malayalam film Ustad Hotel (2012).

Cast 
Rachan Chandra as Rishi
Vedhika as Rishi's girlfriend
Prakash Raj as Rishi's grandfather
Anant Nag
Raj Deepak Shetty as CEO

Production 
The film is a remake of the Malayalam film Ustad Hotel (2012) and features newcomer Rachan Chandra, Vedhika, and Prakash Raj in the lead roles. The film was adapted to suit the Kannada audience. The film was shorter than the Malayalam original. Anant Nag was cast to play a role in the film. While the Malayalam film featured biriyani, this film featured mudde.

Soundtrack 
This film marks the Kannada debut of Tamil music composer Yuvan Shankar Raja.

Release 
The Times of India gave the film a rating of two-and-a-half out of five stars and stated that "Go ahead, watch it if you want to check out an okay effort that is nearly salvaged in the second half".

References

External links 

2010s Kannada-language films
2010s romantic musical films
2017 romantic comedy-drama films
2017 films
2010s coming-of-age comedy-drama films
Cooking films
Films about food and drink
Indian coming-of-age comedy-drama films
Indian romantic comedy-drama films
Indian romantic musical films
Films directed by Pon Kumaran
Films scored by Yuvan Shankar Raja
Films set in hotels
 Kannada remakes of Malayalam films